It's an Adventure, Charlie Brown is the 25th prime-time animated television special based upon the popular comic strip Peanuts, by Charles M. Schulz. It was originally aired on the CBS network on May 16, 1983. It, along with 1982's A Charlie Brown Celebration, inspired the Saturday Morning series The Charlie Brown and Snoopy Show.

Format
The special is a compilation consisting of eight individual stories adapted from the stories in the comic strip:
 Sack: Charlie Brown is having hallucinations as a result of a rash on the back of his head resembling the stitchings of a baseball, most notably seeing the rising sun as a baseball. After consulting with his doctor, he goes to camp in an attempt to get over his hallucinations.  To hide his rash, he puts a paper bag over his head. Charlie Brown's fellow campers begin calling him "Sack" and elect him as camp president, constantly professing their respect and admiration for him. When he removes his sack the next morning, however, he becomes unpopular again. Charlie Brown watches the sun rise, fearing that it will appear as a rising baseball. Instead, the sun is replaced with MAD Magazine mascot Alfred E. Neuman.
 Caddies: Peppermint Patty and Marcie become golf caddies. They are forced to deal with an obnoxious supervisor and a pair of female golfers whose bickering degenerates into violence. Fed up with their duties, they quit the job, but not before making $1.
 Kite: Charlie Brown, sick of the Kite Eating Tree, bites it as retaliation for eating his kites. Shortly after, he receives a letter from the Environmental Protection Agency threatening action against him. To evade the EPA, Charlie Brown runs away from home. He wanders into a strange neighborhood and accepts a job offer to coach a younger baseball team, even though this requires that he sleep in a cardboard box at night. Charlie Brown gains the respect and admiration of his players despite their incompetence. He discovers that his new team's first game is against his old team. Charlie Brown's old teammates inform him that he can come home, as the Kite Eating Tree was blown over in a storm, thus clearing his name.
 Song: Lucy comes to Schroeder's house, annoying him while he tries to play many pieces.
 Sally: Sally tells jokes in class. (This story was added as part of The Charlie Brown and Snoopy Show.)
 Butterfly: Peppermint Patty falls asleep with a butterfly resting on her nose, and Marcie fools her into believing it turned into an angel. Peppermint Patty attempts to contact religious leaders to share her story but is unsuccessful.
 Blanket: Lucy attempts to get rid of Linus's blanket twice: first by burying it and later by turning it into a kite and letting it go.  When separated from his blanket, Linus has a panic attack and is desperate to find it. Thankfully, Snoopy goes to great lengths to get his blanket back for him both times.
 Woodstock: Woodstock performs many of his antics in front of Snoopy, who is taking an afternoon nap. (This story was added as part of The Charlie Brown and Snoopy Show.)

Voice cast

 Michael Catalano as Charlie Brown
 Angela Lee Sloan as Lucy van Pelt
 Earl "Rocky" Reilly as Linus van Pelt
 Cindi Reilly as Sally Brown
 Brent Hauer as Peppermint Patty
 Michael Dockery as Marcie
 Brad Schacter as Schroeder
 Brian Jackson as Camp Kids
 Jason Castellano as Camp Kids
 Gerard Goyette Jr. as Caddie Master
 Jenny Lewis as Ruby
 Johnny Graves as Austin
 Joel Graves as Leland
 Jason Mendelson as Milo
 John Hiestand as Joe Mouth
 Bill Melendez as Snoopy and Woodstock

References

External links
 

Peanuts television specials
Television shows directed by Bill Melendez
1980s American television specials
1980s animated television specials
CBS original programming
1983 television specials
1980s American animated films
1983 in American television
CBS television specials
Summer camps in television
Television shows written by Charles M. Schulz